David Brodie (born June 10, 1974) is a Canadian political strategist,> and communications consultant with Citizen Relations, a global public relations firm. He heads up the firm's office in Vancouver, British Columbia as senior vice president and general manager. He was born in Edmonton, Alberta, Canada.

David served in the Office of the Rt. Hon. Paul Martin, Prime Minister of Canada as the Senior Special Assistant for Northern and Western Canada. He was responsible for policy and issues management and the operational aspects of leading prime ministerial tours and events throughout the region. Prior to this, David held the position of National Director of Operations on the Paul Martin Federal Liberal leadership campaign in 2002, and served from 1998 to 2002 as a senior political advisor in the Office of the Minister of Finance. In this role he coordinated Ministerial events in every province and territory of Canada, and served on the task forces responsible for coordinating meetings of the Commonwealth, G-8, APEC and G-20. During this time he was named one of the top 20 political staffer on Parliament Hill by the Hill Times.

His political involvement also includes time working for Judy Bethel (Liberal MP- Edmonton East), Nicholas Taylor (former leader of the Alberta Liberal Party and Senator) and serving as the president of the Alberta Young Liberals.

In the 2011 B.C. Liberal leadership contest Brodie supported the candidacy of Premier Christy Clark.

Apart from his political involvement, David Brodie is also recognized as a leading authority on crisis communications. He has led large scale emergency exercise projects for both the Canadian Embassy in Tokyo and the British Embassy in Tokyo, and been a commentator on crisis communications on CBC and the Vancouver Sun. He also worked as a volunteer on tsunami relief efforts in Thailand in 2005.

In 2013 his agency was named the Canadian PR Agency of the Year by the Homes Report and a campaign he developed with Tourism British Columbia was named best North American Travel and Tourism PR campaign by the Sabre awards in 2012.

David has traveled extensively in the Asia Pacific region and created and hosted a popular podcast Travel in 10 focusing on international travel. He is a trustee of the Jack Webster Foundation, a former Director of the Board of the Greater Vancouver Food Bank and a member of the Canadian Ship for World Youth Alumni Association, an international exchange program focused of promoting international cooperation, sponsored through the Government of Japan.

References

Paul Martin's Shadow PMO: Paul Martin’s legions of staffers are set to take over the most powerful office in the land
All the King's Men
There's big fish in the west coast Liberal pond
Martin coronation assured by Campbell Clark and Jane Taber
PR Campaign Puts British Columbia on the Map in Two Major Markets
Public Relations in Canada: Interview with David Brodie
Business in Vancouver: For The Record
Citizen Relations Makes Several Executive Appointments Across Canada
Citoyen Optimum and Citizen Relations Poised for Growth with New National Executive Team
Cannabis companies get mixed public relations reception
Social media use kicks into high gear for disaster coverage
"Facebook Likes and Election Results To Be Compared"
Can Facebook Predict the Outcome of the Federal Election?
Public Relations in Canada: Interview with David Brodie
Citizen Relations names new North American leader
Public Relations in Canada: Interview with David Brodie
Canadians trying to learn fate of loved ones after quake in Japan
Candidates for BC Liberal Leadership: Measuring Online Influence
Announcing TBEX Cancun Speakers
The people behind Paul Martin
Interim NDP leader "liked" calls for Kwan to resign
Martini on the Rocks
A total of 11 PMO staffers have left in less than five months
Amateur Traveler: Travel to Fiji
This Week In Travel Podcast
Martin Coronation Assured
Canadian Living July 2001 - Travel Talk: Journey Around the World in 10 Minutes or Less
Tsunami advisory in place for B.C. after Japanese quake
Communication and Japan
The Federal Liberal Contenders
"References to "David Brodie in Paul Martin Biography "Come Hell or Highwater"
"References to "David Brodie in Vancouver Magazine's Power 50 edition"

External links 
Travel in 10 website
http://lonelyplanet.mytripjournal.com/davidandnatalya
http://www.swycanada.org/
David Brodie LinkedIn Profile
Citizen Relations
Interview on the Passport Travel Podcast
Interview with PR in Canada

1974 births
Canadian political consultants
Living people
People from Edmonton